The Breiðabliks men's basketball team, commonly known as Breiðablik, is the men's basketball department of the Breiðablik multi-sport club. It is based in Kópavogur, Iceland.

Breiðablik also has a men's reserve team that plays in the amateur level Icelandic 4th-tier 3. deild karla, called Breiðablik-b.

Honours

Titles
Division I
 Winners (6): 1976, 1992, 1995, 2001, 2008, 2021

Division II
 Winners (1): 1985

Individual awards

Úrvalsdeild Men's Coach of the Year 
Birgir Guðbjörnsson - 1996
Eggert Garðarsson - 2002
Úrvalsdeild Men's Domestic All-First Team 
Pálmi Freyr Sigurgeirsson - 2002, 2004
Úrvalsdeild Men's Young Player of the Year 
Rúnar Ingi Erlingsson - 2009

Notable past players

Coaches
 Pálmar Sigurðsson 1993–1995
 Jón Arnar Ingvarsson 2002–2005
 Hrafn Kristjánsson 2009–2010
 Borce Ilievski 2012–2014
 Pétur Ingvarsson 2018–present

Reserve team
In 2019, Breiðablik-b won the 3. deild karla after beating ÍR in the league finals and achieved promotion to the 2. deild karla.

Titles
Division III
 Winners: 2019

References

External links
Breiðablik team info

Breiðablik (basketball)